A total lunar eclipse took place at the Moon's descending node of the orbit on Wednesday, February 10, 1971, the first of two total lunar eclipses in 1971. It had an umbral magnitude of 1.30819. The moon passed through the center of the Earth's shadow. The Moon was plunged into darkness for 1 hour, 22 minutes and 11.4 seconds, in a deep total eclipse which saw the Moon 30.819% of its diameter inside the Earth's umbral shadow. The visual effect of this depends on the state of the Earth's atmosphere, but the Moon may have been stained a deep red colour. The partial eclipse lasted for 3 hours, 44 minutes and 42.9 seconds and in total. Occuring only 2.7 days before apogee (Apogee on Saturday, February 13, 1971), the Moon's apparent diameter was 5.9% smaller than average.

Visibility
It was completely visible from North America, rising from Eastern Asia, Australia, and setting over South America, Europe and Africa.

Related eclipses

Lunar year series

Saros series

It last occurred on January 29, 1953 and will next occur on February 20, 1989.

Half-Saros cycle
A lunar eclipse will be preceded and followed by solar eclipses by 9 years and 5.5 days (a half saros). This lunar eclipse is related to two total solar eclipses of Solar Saros 130.

See also
List of lunar eclipses
List of 20th-century lunar eclipses

Notes

External links

1971-02
1971-02
1971 in science
February 1971 events